Paul Robert Miller (born April 27, 1965) is a former professional baseball pitcher. He played parts of three seasons in Major League Baseball for the Pittsburgh Pirates from 1991 until 1993.

Miller spent his entire professional career in the Pirates organization. He was drafted by the Pirates in the 53rd round of the 1987 Major League Baseball Draft, and made his major league debut four years later. He pitched 10 games over three seasons, with one win and no losses. He spent one more season in the minors in 1994 before retiring.

References

External links

Major League Baseball pitchers
Pittsburgh Pirates players
Gulf Coast Pirates players
Augusta Pirates players
Salem Buccaneers players
Harrisburg Senators players
Carolina Mudcats players
Buffalo Bisons (minor league) players
Baseball players from Wisconsin
Carthage Firebirds baseball players
People from Burlington, Wisconsin
1965 births
Living people